The David di Donatello for Best Cinematography is a film award presented annually by the Accademia del Cinema Italiano (ACI, Academy of Italian Cinema) to recognize outstanding efforts on the part of cinematographers who have worked within the Italian film industry during the year preceding the ceremony.
The award was first given in 1981.

Luca Bigazzi is the record holder with seven awards in the category.

Winners and nominees
Winners are indicated in bold.

1980s
1981
 Pasqualino De Santis - Three Brothers
 Tonino Delli Colli - Camera d'albergo
 Ennio Guarnieri - The Lady of the Camellias

1982
 Tonino Delli Colli - Tales of Ordinary Madness
 Danilo Desideri - Portrait of a Woman, Nude
 Sergio D'Offizi - Il Marchese del Grillo

1983
 Franco Di Giacomo - The Night of the Shooting Stars
 Armando Nannuzzi - Il mondo nuovo
 Carlo Di Palma - Identification of a Woman

1984
 Giuseppe Rotunno - And the Ship Sails On
 Ricardo Aronovich - Le Bal (1983 film)
 Dante Spinotti - Hearts and Armour

1985
 Pasqualino De Santis - Carmen
 Giuseppe Lanci - Kaos
 Alfio Contini - A Proper Scandal

1986
 Giuseppe Lanci - Camorra
 Tonino Delli Colli and Ennio Guarnieri - Ginger and Fred
 Dante Spinotti - The Berlin Affair

1987
 Tonino Delli Colli - The Name of the Rose
 Ricardo Aronovich - The Family
 Franco Di Giacomo - The Inquiry

1988
 Vittorio Storaro - The Last Emperor
 Franco Di Giacomo - Dark Eyes
 Tonino Delli Colli - Intervista

1989
 Dante Spinotti - The Legend of the Holy Drinker
 Giuseppe Lanci - Francesco
 Luciano Tovoli - Splendor

1990s
1990
 Giuseppe Rotunno - The Bachelor
 Tonino Nardi - Open Doors
 Tonino Delli Colli - The Voice of the Moon
 Pasqualino De Santis - The Palermo Connection
 Luciano Tovoli - What Time Is It?

1991
 Luciano Tovoli - Captain Fracassa's Journey
 Italo Petriccione - Mediterraneo
 Alessio Gelsini Torresi - Ultra
 Giuseppe Lanci - The Sun Also Shines at Night
 Giuseppe Lanci - The Conviction

1992
 Danilo Desideri - Maledetto il giorno che t'ho incontrato
 Tonino Nardi and Renato Tafuri - The Stolen Children
 Ennio Guarnieri - The Inner Circle

1993
 Alessio Gelsini Torresi - The Escort
 Luca Bigazzi - Death of a Neapolitan Mathematician
 Giuseppe Lanci - Fiorile

1994
 Bruno Cascio - Father and Son
 Dante Spinotti - The Secret of the Old Woods
 Luca Bigazzi - A Soul Split in Two
 Giuseppe Lanci - Caro diario

1995
 Luca Bigazzi - Lamerica
 Luca Bigazzi - Nasty Love
 Franco Di Giacomo - Il Postino: The Postman

1996
 Alfio Contini - Beyond the Clouds
 Darius Khondji - Stealing Beauty
 Dante Spinotti - The Star Maker

1997
 Tonino Delli Colli - Marianna Ucrìa
 Pasqualino De Santis and Marco Pontecorvo - The Truce
 Blasco Giurato - The Game Bag
 Giuseppe Lanci - The Prince of Homburg
 Italo Petriccione - Nirvana

1998
 Tonino Delli Colli - Life Is Beautiful
 Luca Bigazzi - Le acrobate
 Pasquale Mari - Rehearsals for War

1999
 Lajos Koltai - The Legend of 1900
 Luca Bigazzi - The Way We Laughed
 Fabio Cianchetti - Besieged

2000s
2000
 Luca Bigazzi - Bread and Tulips
 Fabio Cianchetti - Canone inverso
 Giuseppe Lanci - The Nanny

2001
 Lajos Koltai - Malèna
 Franco Di Giacomo - Unfair Competition
 Roberto Forza - One Hundred Steps

2002
 Fabio Olmi - The Profession of Arms
 Luca Bigazzi - Burning in the Wind
 Arnaldo Catinari - Light of My Eyes

2003
 Daniele Nannuzzi - El Alamein: The Line of Fire
 Maurizio Calvesi - The Soul Keeper
 Gian Filippo Corticelli - Facing Windows
 Marco Onorato - The Embalmer
 Dante Spinotti - Pinocchio
 Fabio Zamarion - Respiro

2004
 Italo Petriccione - I'm Not Scared
 Danilo Desideri - Love Is Eternal While It Lasts
 Fabio Olmi - Singing Behind Screens
 Marco Onorato - First Love
 Fabio Zamarion -What Will Happen to Us

2005
 Luca Bigazzi - The Consequences of Love
 Tani Canevari - Manual of Love
 Arnaldo Catinari - The Life That I Want
 Dante Cecchin - After Midnight
 Gian Filippo Corticelli - Cuore Sacro

2006
 Luca Bigazzi - Romanzo Criminale
 Arnaldo Catinari - The Caiman
 Fabio Cianchetti - Our Land
 Danilo Desideri - My Best Enemy
 Marcello Montarsi - Notte prima degli esami

2007
 Fabio Zamarion - The Unknown Woman
 Alessandro Pesci - Napoleon and Me
 Luca Bigazzi - The Family Friend
 Agnès Godard - Nuovomondo
 Fabio Olmi - One Hundred Nails

2008
 Ramiro Civita - The Girl by the Lake
 Luca Bigazzi - The Right Distance
 Maurizio Calvesi - I Vicerè
 Arnaldo Catinari - Parlami d'amore
 Alessandro Pesci - Quiet Chaos

2009
 Luca Bigazzi - Il Divo
 Arnaldo Catinari - The Demons of St. Petersberg 
 Marco Onorato - Gomorrah
 Italo Petriccione - As God Commands
 Vittorio Storaro - Caravaggio

2010s
2010
 Daniele Ciprì - Vincere
 Enrico Lucidi - Baarìa
 Roberto Cimatti - The Man Who Will Come
 Nicola Pecorini - The First Beautiful Thing
 Maurizio Calvesi - Loose Cannons

2011
 Renato Berta - Noi credevamo
 Vittorio Omodei Zorini - 20 sigarette
 Luca Bigazzi - The Jewel
 Fabio Cianchetti - The Solitude of Prime Numbers
 Arnaldo Catinari - Angel of Evil

2012
 Luca Bigazzi - This Must Be the Place
 Paolo Carnera - ACAB - All Cops Are Bastards
 Simone Zampagni - Caesar Must Die 
 Alessandro Pesci - We Have a Pope
 Roberto Forza - Piazza Fontana: The Italian Conspiracy

2013
 Marco Onorato (posthumous) - Reality
 Fabio Cianchetti - Me and You
 Gherardo Gossi - Diaz - Don't Clean Up This Blood
 Italo Petriccione - Siberian Education
 Fabio Zamarion - The Best Offer

2014
 Luca Bigazzi - The Great Beauty
 Jérôme Alméras - Human Capital
 Daniele Ciprì - Salvo
 Gian Filippo Corticelli - Fasten Your Seatbelts
 Gergely Poharnok - Miele

2015
 Vladan Radovic - Black Souls
 Fabio Cianchetti - Hungry Hearts
 Renato Berta - Leopardi
 Italo Petriccione - The Invisible Boy
 Fabio Olmi - Greenery Will Bloom Again

2016
 Peter Suschitzky - Tale of Tales
 Michele D'Attanasio - They Call Me Jeeg
 Maurizio Calvesi - Don't Be Bad
 Paolo Carnera - Suburra
 Luca Bigazzi - Youth

2017
 Michele D'Attanasio - Italian Race
 Daniele Ciprì - Sweet Dreams
 Ferran Paredes Rubio - Indivisible
 Vladan Radovic - Like Crazy
 Maurizio Calvesi - The Confessions

2018
 Gian Filippo Corticelli - Napoli velata
 Tim Curtin - A Ciambra
 Gianni Mammolotti - Malarazza - Una storia di periferia
 Luca Bigazzi - Sicilian Ghost Story
 Fabrizio Lucci - The Place

2019
 Nicolaj Brüel - Dogman
 Michele D'Attanasio - Capri-Revolution
 Sayombhu Mukdeeprom - Call Me by Your Name
 Paolo Carnera - Boys Cry
 Hélène Louvart - Happy as Lazzaro

2020s
2020
 Daniele Ciprì - The First King: Birth of an Empire
 Vladan Radovic - The Traitor
 Franco Di Giacomo - Martin Eden
 Nicolaj Brüel - Pinocchio
 Daria D'Antonio - Ricordi?

References

External links
 
 David di Donatello official website

David di Donatello
Awards for best cinematography